Myagrino is a rural locality (a village) in Mayskoye Rural Settlement, Vologodsky District, Vologda Oblast, Russia. The population was 2 as of 2002.

Geography 
Myagrino is located 19 km northwest of Vologda (the district's administrative centre) by road. Mitenskoye is the nearest rural locality.

References 

Rural localities in Vologodsky District